Methodius III, called Moronis or Maronis, (? – 1679) was Ecumenical Patriarch of Constantinople in 1668–1671.

Descended from Crete, he served at the Church of the Theotokos of Chrysopigi in Galata. In 1646, he was elected Metropolitan of Heraclea. On 5 January 1668, he was elected Ecumenical Patriarch, succeeding Patriarch Clement.

But because former Patriarch Parthenius was hostile towards him, he was forced to resign in March 1671 and to become a monk in the Nea Moni of Chios and after that in the Strofades Monastery in Zakynthos. In 1677, he went to Venice and became commissioner in the orthodox Church of Saint George, which served the local Greek-speaking community, until 1679 when he died.

Sources
Ecumenical Patriarchate
Νεώτερον Εγκυκλοπαιδικόν Λεξικόν Ηλίου Vol. 13, p. 172.

1679 deaths
17th-century Greek clergy
Religious leaders from Crete
17th-century Ecumenical Patriarchs of Constantinople
Year of birth unknown